The Blockbuster Cinemas is a cineplex located in Dhaka, Bangladesh. It was opened on September 6, 2013. It is the largest multiplex in the country.

History
Although the multiplex was supposed to be opened on August 8, 2013, it did not happen then. Located in Jamuna Future Park, the multiplex was opened with a red carpet on 1 September 2013 and an inaugurated 5 days later. Mrittika Maya was screened at Blockbuster Cinemas on the red carpet. The multiplex was inaugurated by showing the Oblivion.

Features
75 employees work in this 1880 seat multiplex. Blockbuster Cinemas has 280 seats per screen except Club Royal. There are special arrangements for VIP viewers. It has matinee, evening and night shows.

Screens
 Irish
 Montage
 Thrill
 Exposure
 Utsob
 Transition
 Club Royal

References

Jamuna Group
Cinemas in Dhaka
2013 establishments in Bangladesh
Buildings and structures in Dhaka